Nord Anglia International School Hong Kong is an international school in Hong Kong. The international school opened in September 2014. , it headed by Kenny Duncan. The school's curriculum consists of the International Baccalaureate, English National Curriculum and IGCSE.

History
By March 2014, over 500 students applied to attend the school and over 1,000 persons applied for teaching positions.

Circa 2016, the school had plans to charge a $20,000 HKD fee per student per year, but plans were shelved after they protested during a meeting. , the school had plans to open a new campus at the Tin Wan Shopping Centre, but it received opposition from area politicians.

In 2021, the school announced its new secondary campus located in Kwun Tong (Formerly the campus of Delia School of Canada (East Kowloon)). Subject to government approval, the school will open for the 2021–22 academic year.

Campuses
There are four Nord Anglia campuses in Hong Kong. 
 Lam Tin, Kowloon (formerly Sing Yin Secondary School campus), which serves students from ages 3 through to 11 years of age, or nursery through to Secondary school. 
 Sai Kung Town, New Territories, which serves students for Pre-School
 Tai Tam, Hong Kong Island, which serves students for Pre-School
 Kwun Tong, Kowloon (Formerly the campus of Delia School of Canada (East Kowloon)), which serves secondary students.

References

External links
 Nord Anglia International School Hong Kong

2014 establishments in Hong Kong
Educational institutions established in 2014
International schools in Hong Kong
Nord Anglia Education
Kwun Tong District